Johannes Michalski ( – November 4, 2019) was a Belgian-born American painter. A double amputee, he painted by holding the brush with his mouth.

Works

References

1930s births
2019 deaths
Belgian emigrants to the United States
People from St. George, Utah
Académie Royale des Beaux-Arts alumni
Artists with disabilities
Belgian amputees
American amputees
Painters from Utah
20th-century Belgian painters
20th-century American painters
21st-century American painters
21st-century American male artists
20th-century American male artists